Yuri Petrovich Hromak (26 March 1948 – 14 December 1998) was a Ukrainian former backstroke swimmer. He won a bronze medal in the 4 × 100 m medley relay at the 1968 Summer Olympics and a European gold in the 200 backstroke in 1966. During his short career, he won two national titles, in the 100 m and 200 m backstroke in 1967. He retired in 1970.

References

1948 births
1998 deaths
Sportspeople from Lviv
Ukrainian male backstroke swimmers
Olympic swimmers of the Soviet Union
Swimmers at the 1968 Summer Olympics
Olympic bronze medalists for the Soviet Union
Olympic bronze medalists in swimming
European Aquatics Championships medalists in swimming
Medalists at the 1968 Summer Olympics
Soviet male backstroke swimmers